Mademoiselle is a French courtesy title, abbreviated Mlle,  traditionally given to an unmarried woman. The equivalent in English is "Miss". The courtesy title "Madame" is accorded women where their marital status is unknown.

From around 1970 onwards, the use of the title "Mademoiselle" was challenged in France, particularly by feminist groups who wanted it banned. A circular from François Fillon, then Prime Minister, dated 21 February 2012, called for the deletion of the word "Mademoiselle" in all official documents. On 26 December 2012, the Council of State approved the deletion.

See also
Fräulein, a similar German term

References

French words and phrases
Women's social titles
Honorifics